The 1934 Wisconsin Badgers football team was an American football team that represented the University of Wisconsin in the 1934 Big Ten Conference football season. The team compiled a 4–4 record (2–3 against conference opponents) and finished in a tie for fifth place in the Big Ten Conference. Clarence Spears was in his third year as Wisconsin's head coach.

Guard Milt Kummer was selected as the team's most valuable player. John Bender was the team captain. End Stan Haukedahl and guard Mario Pacetti were selected by the United Press as second-team players on the 1934 All-Big Ten Conference football team. Lynn Jordan returned a kickoff 99 yards for a touchdown against Michigan on November 10, 1934.

The team played its home games at Camp Randall Stadium, which had a capacity of 32,700. During the 1934 season, the average attendance at home games was 20,666.

Schedule

References

Wisconsin
Wisconsin Badgers football seasons
Wisconsin Badgers football